JBA can refer to:

 The Joseph Baldwin Academy for Eminent Young Scholars
 All Japan B-Daman Association
 JBA Motors
 Jens Berthel Askou, a Danish association football player
 JetBlue Airways, is a major American airline low cost passenger carrier.
 John Brown's Army, a fictional terrorist organisation in Splinter Cell: Double Agent
 The Jumping Bomb Angels, a professional wrestling tag team
 Jewish Babylonian Aramaic, a Jewish language
 Joint Base Andrews, a U.S. military facility
 Junior Basketball Association, a professional basketball league for young men players
 JoJo's Bizarre Adventure, a Japanese manga series
 Japan Basketball Association